Sasindu Perera (born 25 March 1993) is a Sri Lankan cricketer. He made his first-class and List A debuts in the 1999/00 season.

References

External links
 

1993 births
Living people
Sri Lankan cricketers
Sri Lanka Police Sports Club cricketers
Vauniya District cricketers
People from Western Province, Sri Lanka
People from Panadura